Up Your Alley may refer to:

 Up Your Alley (album), by Joan Jett and the Blackhearts
 Up Your Alley (film), starring Linda Blair
 Up Your Alley (arcade game), an arcade game
 "Up Your Alley", an episode of Home Improvement
 Up Your Alley Fair, a leather and fetish event held in San Francisco, California